iZombie may refer to:

iZombie (TV series), American TV series
iZombie (comic book), comic book